Qikiqtarjuaq (Inuktitut syllabics: ᕿᑭᖅᑕᕐᔪᐊᖅ) formerly Big Island is an uninhabited island located in the Qikiqtaaluk Region, Nunavut, Canada. It lies in Hudson Strait and is separated from Baffin Island by White Strait.

Other islands in the immediate vicinity include Upirngiviaaluk and Rabbit Island.

References

Islands of Baffin Island
Islands of Hudson Strait
Uninhabited islands of Qikiqtaaluk Region